Uranothauma uganda is a butterfly in the family Lycaenidae. It is found in Tanzania (Mount Bondwa in the Uluguru Mountains) and Malawi (Mount Mlanje). Despite the name, the species is not found in Uganda.

References

Butterflies described in 1980
Uranothauma